Acid-fastness is a physical property of certain bacterial and eukaryotic cells, as well as some sub-cellular structures, specifically their resistance to decolorization by acids during laboratory staining procedures. Once stained as part of a sample, these organisms can resist the acid and/or ethanol-based decolorization procedures common in many staining protocols, hence the name acid-fast.

The mechanisms of acid-fastness vary by species, although the most well-known example is in the genus Mycobacterium, which includes the species responsible for tuberculosis and leprosy. The acid-fastness of Mycobacteria is due to the high mycolic acid content of their cell walls, which is responsible for the staining pattern of poor absorption followed by high retention. Some bacteria may also be partially acid-fast, such as Nocardia.

Acid-fast organisms are difficult to characterize using standard microbiological techniques, though they can be stained using concentrated dyes, particularly when the staining process is combined with heat. Some, such as Mycobacteria, can be stained with the Gram stain, but they do not take the crystal violet well and thus appear light purple, which can still potentially result in an incorrect gram negative identification.

The most common staining technique used to identify acid-fast bacteria is the Ziehl–Neelsen stain, in which the acid-fast species are stained bright red and stand out clearly against a blue background. Another method is the Kinyoun method, in which the bacteria are stained bright red and stand out clearly against a green background. Acid-fast Mycobacteria can also be visualized by fluorescence microscopy using specific fluorescent dyes (auramine-rhodamine stain, for example). The eggs of the parasitic lung fluke Paragonimus westermani are actually destroyed by the stain, which can hinder diagnosis in patients who present with TB-like symptoms.

Some acid-fast staining techniques
 Ziehl–Neelsen stain (classic and modified bleach types)
 Kinyoun stain
 For color blind people (or in backgrounds where detecting red bacteria is difficult), Victoria blue can be substituted for carbol fuchsin and picric acid can be used as the counter stain instead of methylene blue, and the rest of the Kinyoun technique can be used.
 Various bacterial spore staining techniques using Kenyon e.g.
 Moeller's method
 Dorner's method (acid alcohol decolorizer) without the Schaeffer–Fulton modification (decolorize by water)
 Detergent method, using Tergitol 7, nonionic polyglycol ether surfactants type NP-7 
 Fite stain
 Fite-Faraco stain
 Wade Fite stain
 Ellis and Zabrowarny stain (no phenol/carbolic acid)
 Auramine-rhodamine stain
 Auramine phenol stain

Notable acid-fast structures

Very few structures are acid-fast; this makes staining for acid-fastness particularly useful in diagnosis. The following are notable examples of structures which are acid-fast or modified acid-fast:
 All mycobacteria – M. tuberculosis, M. leprae, M. smegmatis and atypical Mycobacterium
 Actinomycetes (especially some aerobic ones) with mycolic acid in their cell wall (note Streptomyces do NOT have); not to be confused with Actinomyces, which is a non-acid-fast genus of actinomycete
Nocardia (weakly acid-fast; resists decolorization with weaker acid concentrations) 
 Rhodococcus
 Gordonia (an actinomycete)
 Tsukamurella
 Dietzia
 Head of sperm
 Bacterial spores, see Endospore
 Legionella micdadei
 Certain cellular inclusions e.g.
 Cytoplasmic inclusion bodies seen in
 Neurons in layer 5 of cerebral cortex neuronal ceroid lipofuscinosis (Batten disease).
 Nuclear inclusion bodies seen in
 Lead poisoning
 Bismuth poisoning.
 Oocysts of some coccidian parasites in faecal matter, such as:
 Cryptosporidium parvum,
 Isospora belli
 Cyclospora cayetanensis.
 A few other parasites:
 Sarcocystis
 Taenia saginata eggs stain well but Taenia solium eggs don't (can be used to distinguish)
 Hydatid cysts, especially their "hooklets" stain irregularly with ZN stain but emanate bright red fluorescence under green light, and can aid detection in moderately heavy backgrounds or with scarce hooklets.
 Fungal yeast forms are inconsistently stained with Acid-fast stain which is considered a narrow spectrum stain for fungi. In a study on acid-fastness of fungi, 60% of blastomyces and 47% of histoplasma showed positive cytoplasmic staining of the yeast-like cells, and Cryptococcus or candida did not stain, and very rare staining was seen in Coccidioides endospores.

References

Online protocol examples
 Ziehl–Neelsen protocol (PDF format).
 Alternate Ellis & Zabrowarny method  for staining AFB.

 
Bacteria
Staining